Leendert Roelof Jan "Leen" Vente (14 May 19119 November 1989) was a Dutch footballer who played as a striker. He earned 21 caps and scored 19 goals for the Netherlands national football team, and played in the 1934 and 1938 World Cups.

Playing career
Vente started in the Rotterdam Football Association for Semper Melior and later for Pro Patria. He eventually joined Neptunus where he initially also participated in athletics.

In April 1936, Vente moved to Feijenoord. He was one of the players that participated in the opening match of stadium De Kuip in 1937. Feyenoord played Beerschot and won 5–2. Vente scored the first ever goal in the stadium, and finished the game with a hat-trick. Vente would finish his tenure with the club with 82 league appearances in which he scored 65 goals.

In January 1941, Vente returned to Neptunus.

After retirement
In 1943, Vente obtained his coaching licence. He started his managerial career in 1950 with NOAD. He then coached both EBOH and VOC. He had a short term as manager of Xerxes in 1957. After that he coached, among others, Neptunus and SV Slikkerveer. Vente also worked as a representative during that period.

Vente owned café Leen Vente three times. He lost his second café during the German bombing of Rotterdam. After World War II, he was detained by the "Political Investigation Service" on charges of recruiting from his café, but was soon rehabilitated. Vente turned out to have prevented collaboration with the Axis powers.

Personal life
Vente died on 9 November 1989 in Rotterdam.

His brother's grandson, Dylan Vente, plays for Roda JC Kerkrade and started his career with Feyenoord.

Honours
Feijenoord
 Netherlands Football League Championship: 1937–38, 1939–40

References

1911 births
1989 deaths
Dutch footballers
Netherlands international footballers
Feyenoord players
1934 FIFA World Cup players
1938 FIFA World Cup players
Footballers from Rotterdam
Association football forwards
EBOH managers
Dutch football managers